Trojeglava  is a village in Croatia. It has about 254 population in 2011.

Populated places in Bjelovar-Bilogora County